Mathiatis ( []) is a village located in the Nicosia District of Cyprus. Before 1960, it had a mixed Greek- and Turkish-Cypriot population.

References

Communities in Nicosia District